XHPJON-FM is a radio station on 94.3 FM in Jonuta, Tabasco. It is known as Radio Río and owned by

History
XHPJON was awarded in the IFT-4 radio auction of 2017 — the only new FM station in Tabasco as a result of the auction — and came to air in January 2018, becoming the first commercial radio station in Jonuta.  is jointly owned by Beatriz Elvira Cruz Méndez and Genoveva Gloria Prats Fernández.

References

Radio stations in Tabasco
Radio stations established in 2018
2018 establishments in Mexico